Macrocoma lefevrei is a species of leaf beetle of Saudi Arabia, Oman, Yemen, Iran and Egypt. It was first described by Joseph Sugar Baly in 1878.

References

lefevrei
Beetles of Asia
Beetles described in 1878
Insects of the Arabian Peninsula
Taxa named by Joseph Sugar Baly